Platycheirus fulviventris is a Palearctic species of hoverfly. It is found in many parts of Britain and Europe.

Description
External images
For terms, see: Morphology of Diptera. Femora 1 has dense black hairs along entire length. Tibia 1 is abruptly widened at mid-length, then parallel-sided to the tip.
See references for determination.

Distribution
Palearctic: Fennoscandia south to Iberia and the Mediterranean basin, Ireland east through Northern Europe, Central Europe and Southern Europe into Turkey and European Russia and on to Siberia and the Russian Far East to the Pacific coast.

Biology
Habitat: marsh, fen, river margins of rivers and ditches in farmland. Flies May to August.

References

Diptera of Europe
Syrphinae
Insects described in 1829
Taxa named by Pierre-Justin-Marie Macquart